The Spruce Hole Bog, locally known as Spruce Hole, is a complete ecological community occupying a true kettle hole in the town of Durham,  New Hampshire. According to the National Register of Natural Landmarks: "It illustrates characteristics of a typical sphagnum-heath bog, localized in a specialized geologic setting." It was designated a National Natural Landmark in 1972. It is reached by a woods road off Packer's Falls Road, and despite the name, the surrounding forest is mostly white pine, hemlock, and birch.

The bog is also adjacent to the Oyster River Forest, a permanently conserved + parcel owned by the town of Durham.

References

External links
Spruce Hole Bog and Conservation Area - Durham, New Hampshire
Brief from the National Park Service
Spruce Hole locater map

Bogs of New Hampshire
National Natural Landmarks in New Hampshire
Landforms of Strafford County, New Hampshire
Protected areas of Strafford County, New Hampshire